is a river in Hokkaido, Japan. Located in Kamikawa and Iburi subprefectures, it is one of 13 major 'class 1' rivers on the island.

Course
The Mu River rises on the slopes of Mount Karifuri in the Hidaka Mountains. It flows south and west until it reaches the Pacific Ocean at Mukawa.

Dams

Tributaries  

Shimukappu (upper reaches):

 Horoka Tomamu River 
 Soshubetsu River 
 Pankeshuru River 
 Shimu River

Mukawa (lower reaches):
 Ososukenai River
 Tosano River 
 Horosaru River
 Hobetsu River 
 Rubeshibe River 
 Kinausu River 
 Inaeppusawa River 
 Niwan River
 Yunosawa River 
 Chin River

References

Rivers of Hokkaido